Isomorphic Labs is a drug discovery company launched in the United Kingdom in November 2021. 

The company was established under  Alphabet Inc., the parent company of Google. It is led by Demis Hassabis. Isomorphic Labs was incorporated in February 2021 and announced on November 5, 2021.

Isomorphic Labs uses artificial intelligence for drug discovery.

References

External links
 

Alphabet Inc.
Biotechnology companies
Drug discovery
AI companies
Companies based in London
2021 establishments in the United States